Bourgoin is a French surname. Like the related Bourgoing, Bourgoyne and Bourguignon it is a name denoting a person from Burgundy and therefore of toponymic origin. Notable people with this name include:	
 (1836–1897), French physician and politician	
Gérard Bourgoin (born 1939), French businessman, sports chairman and politician	
Jean Bourgoin (1913–1991), French cinematographer	
Louise Bourgoin (born 1981), French actress, model and television presenter	
Stéphane Bourgoin (born 1953), French writer

References	
	
	
French-language surnames